The Kaipara River drains the area to the northwest of Auckland, New Zealand. It flows north from the northern foothills of the Waitākere Ranges, meandering past the town of Helensville. It is joined by the Kaukapakapa River in its lower tidal reaches shortly before entering the southern Kaipara Harbour. Other major tributaries are the Ararimu, Ahukuramu, Waimauku and Waipatukahu streams.

The area around the river was historically occupied by the Te Taoū hapu of Ngāti Whātua in the lower catchment near present-day Helensville, and by Te Kawerau ā Maki in the upper sections near Kumeū. 

During European settlement in the latter 19th century, the course of the river was altered to better use the river to float timber for milling at Helensville.

The river water is brown, as it is rich in sediments washed in from the soft Miocene to Quaternary sediments within its catchment.

References

Rivers of the Auckland Region
Rivers of New Zealand
Kaipara Harbour catchment